Lannan is a surname. Notable people with the surname include:

Jill Lannan, National Guard of the United States general
John Lannan (born 1984), American baseball player
Marcy Lannan, Canadian actress and voice actress
Michael Lannan, American screenwriter and producer

See also 

 Lannan Eacott or LazarBeam (born 1994), Australian YouTuber